Jean-Baptiste Harang (born 4 April 1949 in Chaulgnes, Nièvre) is a French writer and journalist.

Life 
Jean-Baptiste Harang started working as a journalist at Libération in 1978 before he held the literary critic column from 1998 to 2007. He later worked for Le Magazine Littéraire.

He published his first novel, Le Contraire du coton, in 1993 and received the Inter Book Prize in 2007 for La Chambre de la Stella, an autobiographical novel whose plot is located at Dun-le-Palestel (in Creuse), the native village of his paternal family.

Work 
 1993: Le Contraire du coton, éditions Grasset
 1994: Les Spaghettis d'Hitler, éd. Grasset
 1996: Gros Chagrin, éd. Grasset
 1998: Théodore disparaît, éd. Grasset
 2004: L’art est difficile, éditions Julliard
 2006: La Chambre de la Stella, éd. Grasset – Inter Book Prize 2007
 2008: Prenez un coq : Trente-cinq façons de passer du coq à l'âne à lire au jour le jour, 
 2009: Olivier Estoppey : L'Homme des lisières : Du dessin à l'installation monumentale, avec Nicolas Raboud et Pierre Starobinski
 2006: Nos cœurs vaillants, éd. Grasset – Jean-Giono Jury Prize 2010
 2013: Bordeaux-Vintimille, éd. Grasset - Prix Henri de Régnier, bestowed by the Académie française in 2013

References

External links 
 Jean-Baptiste Harang on France Culture
 Jean-Baptiste Harang at Grasset
 Jean-Baptiste Harang on France Inter
 Jean-Baptiste Harang on the site of the Académie française
 Jean-Baptiste Harang : La chambre de Stella interview on INA.fr

20th-century French writers
21st-century French writers
20th-century French journalists
21st-century French journalists
French literary critics
Prix du Livre Inter winners
People from Nièvre
1949 births
Living people